Samson Mahbod (born February 3, 1989) is a Canadian-American professional ice hockey winger of Iranian descent. He currently plays with the Asiago Hockey, an Italian team of the ICE Hockey League.

Playing career

Junior
Mahbod was drafted in the 2005 QMJHL Entry Draft by the Gatineau Olympiques, in the 5th round (75th overall). He also played for the Acadie-Bathurst Titan, Drummondville Voltigeurs, and the Prince Edward Island Rocket.

Professional
He was not drafted into the NHL, so he made his jump to professional hockey by joining the Elmira Jackals in the 2010–11 ECHL season. That season, he also played for the South Carolina Stingrays, Cincinnati Cyclones, and Utah Grizzlies. The following season, he played for the Arizona Sundogs of the Central Hockey League, before moving back to the ECHL in 2012 with the Alaska Aces. After a short stay in Alaska, he decided to try his luck abroad and joined GKS Katowice for one game.

In 2013, he signed a one-year contract with Ciarko PBS Bank KH Sanok. In addition to winning the playoff championship with the team, he led the league in assists (54) and points (81) and was named the Polish League's Best Player.

In August 2014, he joined Russian club, Toros Neftekamsk of the VHL, where he won the VHL Championship.

In August 2015, he underwent a successful trial with the Espoo Blues of Liiga, and signed a one-year contract. Upon the conclusion of the 2015–16 season, he moved on to the KHL, signing with Medvescak Zagreb in July 2016.

During the 2018–19 season, Mahbod played in 8 games with HC Vítkovice Ridera before leaving the Czech Extraliga in agreeing to a contract for the remainder of the season with German outfit, Krefeld Pinguine of the DEL on November 30, 2018. Mahbob contributed with 6 assists in 16 games with the Pinguine before leaving at the conclusion of the year.

Career statistics

References

External links

1989 births
Acadie–Bathurst Titan players
Alaska Aces (ECHL) players
Arizona Sundogs players
Canadian expatriate ice hockey players in Croatia
Canadian expatriate ice hockey players in Finland
Canadian expatriate ice hockey players in the United States
Canadian ice hockey right wingers
Canadian people of Iranian descent
Cincinnati Cyclones (ECHL) players
Drummondville Voltigeurs players
Elmira Jackals (ECHL) players
Espoo Blues players
Gatineau Olympiques players
HC Vítkovice players
KHL Medveščak Zagreb players
KH Sanok players
Krefeld Pinguine players
Living people
P.E.I. Rocket players
South Carolina Stingrays players
Ice hockey people from Montreal
Sportspeople of Iranian descent
Utah Grizzlies (ECHL) players
HK Dukla Trenčín players
HC Litvínov players
Canadian expatriate ice hockey players in Poland
Canadian expatriate ice hockey players in the Czech Republic
Canadian expatriate ice hockey players in Germany
Canadian expatriate ice hockey players in Slovakia
Canadian expatriate ice hockey players in Italy